Matan or Mattan (original Biblical translation: Mattan, modern Israeli translation: Matan) is a Hebrew name, mostly for males in Israel. It is coming from the word 'gift' and literally means "giving". It is part of the title of the Jewish holiday of Shavuot that is also known as "Z'man Mattan Torah" meaning "[the] time [of the] giving [of the] Torah."

A biblical reference for a Mattan as a given name is the story told in Books of Kings about the Baal priest Mattan, killed by the people of the Kingdom of Judah during a revolution.

In the Gospel of Matthew, Matthan is the paternal grandfather of Joseph, father of Jesus.

King Zedekiah's birth name was originally Mattanyahu.

People
 Matan Balestra (born 1992), Israeli footballer currently playing for Sektzia Nes Tziona on loan from Maccabi Netanya
 Matan Baltaxa (born 1995), Israeli footballer currently playing for Hapoel Acre
 Matan Barashi (born 1988), Israeli footballer currently playing for Ironi Beit Shemesh
 Matan Cohen (born 1982), Israeli musician 
 Matan Hodorov (born 1985), Israeli television commentator
 Matan Hozez (born 1996), Israeli footballer currently playing for Bnei Yehuda
 Matan Kahana (born 1972), Israeli politician
 Matan Naor (born 1980), Israeli basketball player
 Matan Ohayon (born 1986), Israeli footballer currently playing for Israeli club Hapoel Be'er Sheva
 Matan Porat (born 1982), Israeli pianist and composer
 Matan Vilnai (born 1944), Israeli politician and military officer
 Matan Zohar (born 1990), British musician

Hebrew unisex given names